National Heroines and Heroes of Nicaragua are promulgated by legal decree of the Nicaraguan Legislature. Those who receive the title are people who were instrumental in helping the country gain its independence, or who worked to maintain the sovereignty and national self-determination of the country. Initially called National Heroes of Nicaragua, in 2014 legislation was passed via Law No. 859 to change the title to "National Heroines and Heroes of Nicaragua". The amended law provides that to be honored with the title, the person nominated must be deceased, and the nomination must be accompanied by certifications, recognition, or guarantees created by public or private institutions, such as trade unions, artistic associations, sporting organizations, or educational institutions, to confirm their service to the country and exemplary or heroic actions.

List of National Heroes
 1971, José Dolores Estrada, Decree No. 1889
 1980, Benjamín Zeledón, Decree No. 536
 1980, Carlos Fonseca Amador, Decree No. 56
 1981, Germán Pomares Ordóñez, Decree No. 799
 1981, Rigoberto López Pérez, Decree No. 825
 1982, Enmanuel Mongalo y Rubio, Decree No. 1123
 1982, Andrés Castro Estrada, Decree No. 1123
 1982, Juan Santamaría, Decree No. 1123
 1984, Santos López, Decree No. 1410
 2010, Augusto César Sandino, Decree No. 711
 2011, José Santos Zelaya, Decree No. 6332
 2013, Pedro Joaquín Chamorro Cardenal, Decree No. 813
 2015, Blanca Aráuz Pineda, Decree No. 897
 2016, Rubén Darío, Decree No. 927

References 

 
History of Nicaragua
Lists of Nicaraguan people
Hero (title)